Rodolphe Louis Agassiz (September 3, 1871 - July 31, 1933) was a ten goal polo champion who participated in the 1902 International Polo Cup. He later became chairman of the board of the Calumet and Hecla Mining Company.

Biography
He was born on September 3, 1871, to Alexander Emanuel Agassiz (1835–1910) and Anna Russell (1840–1873). His brothers were George Russell Agassiz (1861–1951) and Maximilian Agassiz (1866–1943).

He graduated from Harvard University.

In 1888, the New York Times reported that he was thrown from his horse in Newport, Rhode Island and seriously injured.

He died on July 31, 1933.

References

1871 births
1933 deaths
American polo players
Rodolphe
International Polo Cup
Harvard University alumni
Calumet and Hecla Mining Company personnel